Niedermayrite is a rare hydrated copper cadmium sulfate hydroxide mineral with formula: Cu4Cd(SO4)2(OH)6·4H2O. It crystallizes in the monoclinic system and occurs as encrustations and well formed vitreous blue-green prismatic crystals. It has a specific gravity of 3.36.

Niedermayrite was named for Gerhard Niedermayr (born 1941), an Austrian mineralogist. It was first described in 1998 from a mine in the Lavrion District, Attica, Greece. It is also reported from the Ophir District, Tooele County, Utah.  The environment is in brecciated marble. The cadmium dominant analogue of campigliaite.

References

Cadmium minerals
Copper(II) minerals
Sulfate minerals
Monoclinic minerals
Minerals in space group 11